José Manuel Jiménez Sancho (born 9 May 1976), known as Chema, is a Spanish retired professional footballer who played as a right midfielder.

Club career
Chema was born in Pamplona, Navarre. After an unsuccessful stint with Atlético Madrid (he only represented their reserves) he signed for Real Valladolid in 1997, going on to make 264 competitive appearances for the Castile and León side. He also played a good number of games as an attacking right-back, and made his La Liga debut on 18 October 1997 by featuring the full 90 minutes in a 1–1 home draw against Sporting de Gijón.

In the 2006–07 season, Chema helped the team return to the top flight after a three-year absence, contributing 13 matches. He was released in June 2007 and joined neighbouring Cultural y Deportiva Leonesa in the Segunda División B, having three solid campaigns and being released at the age of 34, following which he moved to another club in that tier and region, CD Guijuelo.

Honours
Valladolid
Segunda División: 2006–07

References

External links

1976 births
Living people
Spanish footballers
Footballers from Pamplona
Association football midfielders
La Liga players
Segunda División players
Segunda División B players
CD Tudelano footballers
Atlético Madrid B players
Real Valladolid players
Cultural Leonesa footballers
CD Guijuelo footballers